Giovanni Battista Nicolai (30 March 1726 – 15 July 1793) was an Italian mathematician and professor at the University of Padua. He was archpriest of Padernello, a frazione of Paese.

Works

References

1726 births
1793 deaths
18th-century Italian mathematicians
18th-century Italian Roman Catholic priests
Academic staff of the University of Padua